Sara Ashurbeyli, sometimes known as Sara Ashurbayli, (27 January 1906 – 17 July 2001 in Baku) was an eminent Azerbaijani historian, orientalist and scholar. She was an expert in Baku's early and medieval history of Baku and published many papers and books.

Biography

The daughter of a rich oil magnate, Sara Ashurbeyli had a perfect education and finished Jeanne D’Arc College in Constantinople in 1925 and entered Baku State University in 1930 this time in Soviet Azerbaijan. She graduated as an orientalist, and she also studied European languages at Azerbaijan Pedagogical Institute, thus besides her native Azerbaijani language she knew Arabic, Persian, Turkish, French, German, Russian, and English. She was also an artist and joined the Union of Azerbaijan's Artists in 1946. During her lifetime she also taught in various institutions and was a dean for a while. She got her Ph.D. in 1966.  A Doctor of History Sciences she was an Azerbaijan State prize laureate.

Her famous works include “History of Baku: Mediaeval period” and “Shirvanshah State”. She has postulated that the origin of name of "Baku" has its origins from Zoroastrianism, taken from the word “baga” which means “the Sun” or  “the God” in several ancient middle-eastern languages.

She died in 2001 at age 95.

References

Azerbaijani orientalists
Azerbaijani nobility
1906 births
2001 deaths
Writers from Baku
Azerbaijani women artists
Azerbaijani women writers
20th-century Azerbaijani historians
20th-century women writers
Women orientalists
Ashurbeyli family